The IAR 316 is a Romanian license-built Aérospatiale SA 316B Alouette III manufactured by Industria Aeronautică Română (IAR).

Design and development

IAR 316

IAR began manufacturing the IAR 316 in 1971 at its plant near Brașov, Romania. Production ended in 1987. 250 units were built, 125 of those were built for the Military of Romania, which still uses it to this day in a training capacity. Some IAR 316s were operated in the civilian role in Romania and others were exported to various nations, including Pakistan, Angola, and Guinea. The IAR 316 was modified to carry weapons more common in the Eastern-bloc, such as 57mm rocket pods, 7.62mm machine guns, and anti-tank missiles. An early example was exhibited at the Paris Air Show in June 1973.

IAR 317

The IAR 317 Airfox was an attempt by IAR to make an attack helicopter out of the IAR 316.  Equipped with the same license-produced Turbomeca Artouste IIIB turboshaft, the IAR 317 featured a stepped two-seat armored cockpit for the pilot and the gunner. The tail boom and rear fuselage was almost identical to the 316.  Stub wings mounted on either side of the airframe allowed for the carriage of weapons, including rocket pods, machine guns, and anti-tank missiles. Only one prototype was built. It participated in the 1985 Paris Air Show.

Operators

National Air Force of Angola

Romanian Air Force

Specifications (IAR 316)

See also

References

1970s Romanian military utility aircraft
1970s Romanian civil utility aircraft
Military helicopters
1970s Romanian helicopters
316
France–Romania relations